The 2021 Triple J Hottest 100 was announced on 22 January 2022. It was the 29th annual countdown of the most popular songs of the year, as voted for by listeners of Australian radio station Triple J.

Australian children's music group the Wiggles was voted into first place with their Like a Version cover of Tame Impala's "Elephant", making it the first Like a Version to place first in a Hottest 100. Olivia Rodrigo and Doja Cat achieved the most entries in the countdown, with both scoring five.

On 18 March 2022, Triple J confirmed that a compilation album would no longer be released in conjunction with the annual countdown.

Background
The Triple J Hottest 100 allows members of the public to vote online for their top ten songs of the year, which are then used to calculate the year's 100 most popular songs. Any song initially released between 1 December 2020 and 30 November 2021 was eligible for the 2021 Triple J Hottest 100.

Voting opened on 14 December 2021.

Projections
Prior to the countdown, four favourites emerged. Various music blogs and bookmakers placed "Stay" by Australian rapper the Kid Laroi and Canadian musician Justin Bieber; "Good 4 U" by American singer Olivia Rodrigo; "The Angel of 8th Ave." by Australian rock band Gang of Youths; and Australian children's music group the Wiggles' Like a Version cover of "Elephant" by Tame Impala as the songs most likely to take first place.

Full list

Countries represented 
 Australia – 55
 United States – 32
 United Kingdom – 10
 Canada – 4
 New Zealand – 3
 Sweden – 1
 Ghana – 1
 Norway – 1
 Indonesia – 1

Artists with multiple entries

Five entries 
 Olivia Rodrigo (4, 13, 33, 60, 67)
 Doja Cat (7, 31, 34, 37, 83)

Four entries 
 Kanye West (44, 50, 82, 97)

Three entries 
 Spacey Jane (3, 12, 30)
 SZA (once as a featured artist and twice as a lead artist) (7, 22, 78)
 Lil Nas X (8, 10, 29)
 Rüfüs Du Sol (9, 19, 25)
 Lorde (26, 62, 81)

Two entries 
 Billie Eilish (5, 80)
 Gang of Youths (6, 57)
 Tom Cardy (11, 17)
 Lime Cordiale (both times as a co-lead artist) (14, 41)
 Idris Elba (both times as a co-lead artist) (14, 41)
 The Jungle Giants (18, 68)
 Ocean Alley (20, 54)
 King Stingray (46, 56)
 Cardi B (once solo and once as a featured artist) (52, 73)
 The Weeknd (once solo and once as a co-lead artist) (53, 83)
 G Flip (once as a lead artist and once as a featured artist) (64, 88)
 Holy Holy (87, 100)

Notes 
 The Wiggles' cover of "Elephant" became the first Like a Version, and the first cover version of any kind, to reach number 1. 
 It also marked the first debut appearance at number 1 since Denis Leary's "Asshole" in 1993, as The Wiggles had not appeared in any previous countdowns.
 Original Wiggle Jeff Fatt became the oldest person (at the age of 68 during the countdown), and the first of Asian descent, to appear on a number-one track.
 By reaching number 2 with "Stay", The Kid Laroi became the highest ranking artist of Indigenous Australian descent in Hottest 100 history, overtaking Thelma Plum's number 9 placing from 2019.
 The track also marked the first ever appearance of pop star Justin Bieber in the Hottest 100, following Triple J's threat to disqualify him from being eligible in 2015.
 Peking Duk made their eighth consecutive appearance, with at least one track featured in every annual countdown since 2014.
 Billie Eilish became the first artist to feature in the top 10 of an annual countdown for four years in a row (2018-2021). The previous record was three consecutive years, held by Powderfinger (1998–2000), The White Stripes (2003–2005), and Chet Faker (2013–2015).
 32 tracks by artists from the United States featured, the highest since 2006.
 The only artist to appear in both the 2022 countdown and the original 1993 list is Paul Kelly.

Top 10 albums of 2021 
The annual Triple J album poll was held across November and December and was announced on 12 December 2021.

References

2021